is a throwing technique described in The Canon Of Judo as a reference technique and demonstrated by Kyuzo Mifune in the video, The Essence of Judo.

Technique description 
Described in The Canon Of Judo by Kyuzo Mifune as a hip throw where tori uses one of his leg much as in Hane Goshi.
In the video, The Essence of Judo, Mifune demonstrates Ushiro Guruma, but notice that his foot does not quite catch uke's hip
as described in The Canon Of Judo, but catches uke's inner thigh instead.

Technique history

Included systems 
Lists:
The Canon Of Judo
Judo technique

Similar techniques, variants, and aliases 
Similar techniques:

 Hane ghoshi

Aliases:
Rear wheel

References

External links

Judo technique